Interamna Lirenas was an ancient Roman colony near the current Pignataro Interamna, in the southern province of Frosinone, central Italy.

Modern archaeological excavations at the site commenced in 2010.

History
Interamna Lirenas was founded in 312 BC as a colonia of Latins in the ager casinas, on the route of the Via Latina. It was situated at the confluence of the Liri and Rio Spalla Bassa rivers, whence the name "Interamna" (meaning "between the rivers").

Interamna Lirenas served as a military base during the Samnite Wars, leading to its  destruction by the Samnites in 294 BC. It was again ravaged by Hannibal in 212 BC; since it later sided with Carthage, after the Carthaginian defeat at Zama in 202 BC it was forced by Rome to pay heavy tribute.

It became a municipium in about 88 BC following the Social Wars when its population became Roman citizens.

In 46 BC Julius Caesar become patronus of the city and the site received further settled veterans ca. 40 BC.

The town was thought to have been a relative backwater but recent archaeology has raised its importance.

Archaeology
Archaeological remains include numerous inscriptions and remains of buildings. The archaeological site has been sampled by use of geophysical techniques (including magnetometry), leading to the discovery of the site of a Roman theatre.

An inscribed ancient sundial donated by Marcus Novius Tubula after his election to the exalted position of Plebeian Tribune in Rome was discovered in the ruins of the theatre in 2017.

References

Sources
G. R. BELLINI, A. LAUNARO, M. MILLETT, "Roman colonial landscapes: Interamna Lirenas and its territory through antiquity", in Roman Republican Colonization, Papers of the Royal Netherlands Institute in Rome, 62, Rome 2014, pp. 255-275

External links
 "Roman Theater Unearthed at Interamna Lirenas" Sep 25, 2013 by Enrico de Lazaro
 The British School at Rome: Interamna Lirenas, Lazio
 Roman Colonial Landscapes project

Roman towns and cities in Italy
Latin cities
Former populated places in Italy
Populated places established in the 4th century BC
310s BC establishments
Roman sites in Lazio
Archaeological sites in Lazio
Coloniae (Roman)